Periegops australia is a species of spider in the genus Periegops that is endemic to South East Queensland in Australia.

Etymology 
The species name comes from the name of the continent of Australia, on which it is found.

Taxonomy 
Periegops australia was described in 1995 by Ray Forster.

Description 
Periegops australia, like other members of the Periegops genus, has only six eyes. Individuals have similar colouration to that found in P. suterii, but the chevron patterns on the abdomen are more strongly pigemented.

References 

Periegopidae
Spiders of Asia
Spiders described in 1995